The 1999 FIA GT Budapest 500 km was the fourth round the 1999 FIA GT Championship season.  It took place at the Hungaroring, Hungary, on 4 July 1999.

Official results
Cars failing to complete 70% of winner's distance are marked as Not Classified (NC).

Statistics
 Pole position – #1 Chrysler Viper Team Oreca – 1:38.862
 Fastest lap – #3 Roock Racing – 1:39.634
 Average speed – 136.357 km/h

References

 
 

B
FIA GT Budapest